Ronald Brown Manners ,  (born 8 January 1936) is an Australian businessman. He is the founder and formerly the chairman of Croesus Mining, at one point Australia's third largest gold producer. He is currently the executive chairman of Mannwest Group and founder and chairman of the Mannkal Economic Education Foundation, an Australian free-market think tank. Manners was one of the founders of the Workers Party, subsequently known as the Progress Party, and is a co-founder of ANDEV (Australians for Northern Development and Economic Vision), a lobby group chaired by co-founder Gina Rinehart. Manners' contribution to the mining industry earned him induction into the Australian Mining Hall of Fame in 2011. Manners was made an Officer of the Order of Australia (AO) in the 2020 Australia Day Honours for "distinguished service to the minerals and mining sectors, and to youth through philanthropic support for educational initiatives," and in 2021 was nominated for the 2021 WA Senior Australian of the Year Award.

Biography

Early life
Ron Manners was born in 1936 in Kalgoorlie, Australia, to a family that had a long association with the mining town. His grandfather, W.G. Manners, the son of a Ballarat prospector, headed West in the late 19th century and established a mining and engineering business, W.G. Manners & Co, in 1895.  Ron Manners studied electrical engineering at the Kalgoorlie School of Mines.

Career in mining
In 1955, Manners assumed management of the family business. He expanded and diversified the company which became the Mannwest Group. He serves as its executive director.

Between 1972 and 1995, he floated several Australian listed mining companies. In 1985, he founded Croesus Mining NL, a gold mining company. He served as its Chairman from 1985 to 2005. While chairman, the company produced 1.275 million ounces of gold and paid 11 dividends. He has also served as Non Executive Chairman of De Grey Mining Ltd.

He is Emeritus Chairman, patron of the Australian Prospectors & Miners' Hall of Fame, inducted in 2011 as a "living legend". He also served as Executive Councillor of the Association of Mining and Exploration Companies (AMEC). He is a Fellow of both the Australasian Institute of Mining and Metallurgy and the Australian Institute of Company Directors. He was elected "mining legend" at the 2005 Excellence in Mining & Exploration Conference in Sydney. In 2012, he defended Gina Rinehart against Wayne Swan in her bid to invest in Fairfax Media.

Manners was made an Officer of the Order of Australia (AO) in the 2020 Australia Day Honours for "distinguished service to the minerals and mining sectors, and to youth through philanthropic support for educational initiatives," and in 2021 was nominated for the 2021 WA Senior Australian of the Year Award.

Other activity
A proponent of the free market, he founded the Mannkal Economic Education Foundation in 1997. He is a member and director of the Mont Pelerin Society and is on the Co-ordinating Committee for the Commonwealth Study Conference. In 2010 he was appointed to the Board of Overseers for the Atlas Economic Research Foundation in Washington, D.C.

Bibliography
As author
 Mannerisms (1985-2020) (2020) 
 The Lonely Libertarian (Turning Ideas Into Gold—Then Gold Into Ideas) (2019) 
 Heroic Misadventures (Australia: Four Decades-Full Circle) (2009) . 
 Never a Dull Moment (with Charles Manners and Nancy Manners) (2002) . 
 Poems of Passion (1979-2020) (self published poems, 2020) . 
As editor
 Kanowna's barrowman: James Balzano, 1859-1948: the early history of Kalgoorlie's goldrushes (with George Compton) (1993) . 
 So I Headed West – W.G. Manners (1992) .

References

External links
 Mannkal Economic Education Foundation
 Mannwest Group

Living people
1936 births
People from Kalgoorlie
People from Perth, Western Australia
Australian prospectors
Australian chief executives
Australian libertarians
Australian writers
Fellows of the Australian Institute of Company Directors
Officers of the Order of Australia